Spectrum SF was a paperback format magazine that published short and serial length works of science fiction.  It was edited by Paul Fraser and published nine issues between 2000 and 2002.

The magazine published work by Charles Stross, Eric Brown, Mary Soon Lee, Alastair Reynolds, and Stephen Baxter. Spectrum SF published the first appearance of the Laundry Files in The Atrocity Archive from Stross.

References

External links
 

British speculative fiction publishers
Publishing companies established in 1999
Science fiction publishers
Small press publishing companies
Defunct science fiction magazines published in the United Kingdom
Science fiction magazines published in Scotland
Science fiction magazines established in the 1990s
1999 establishments in the United Kingdom